Almargem is a non-profit association founded in Loulé, Portugal on June 1988. The main purposes of Almargem are the study and sharing of the most significant historical, cultural, and natural values of the Algarve, the safeguard of these same values and the promotion of activities pursuing nature respectful local development. Almargem is an environmental non-governmental organization (NGO) of regional scope, being registered in the Agência Portuguesa do Ambiente (APA).

References

External links 
 Almargem - official website (Portuguese & English)

Environmental organisations based in Portugal
Non-profit organisations based in Portugal
Sustainability organizations